Valeri Viktorovich Liukin (born 17 December 1966 in Aktyubinsk, Kazakh SSR, Soviet Union) is a Soviet-born Russian-American retired artistic gymnast turned gymnastics coach. As a competitor for the former Soviet Union, Liukin was the 1988 Olympic champion in the team competition and individually on the horizontal bar, and Olympic silver medalist in the all-around and the parallel bars.

Liukin was the first man to do a triple back flip on floor and both a layout Tkatchev and a Jaeger with full twist on high bar. He also has one of the most difficult skills in men's artistic gymnastics named after him, the triple back (tucked) somersault.

Liukin moved to the United States in 1992 and became a U.S. citizen in 2000. He is married to Anna Kotchneva, and is the father and coach of 2008 Olympic champion Nastia Liukin. He is co-owner of the World Olympic Gymnastics Academy with longtime friend Yevgeny Marchenko.

On 15 December 2015, it was announced that Liukin had been inducted as a part of the 2016 class of the USA Gymnastics Hall of Fame.

From 16 September 2016 to 2 February 2018, he was the coordinator for the United States women's national gymnastics team, replacing Márta Károlyi.

He coached the Brazilian women's gymnastics team as of 2018.

Career

Junior
Liukin began gymnastics when he was 7 years old. He moved to Moscow to join the Soviet Junior National team, where he made his world debut at the 1985 Friendship Cup. Coached by Eduard Yarov, Liukin was a member of the Soviet Union National Team until the 1991 dissolution of the Soviet Union.

Senior
At the 1987 European Championships in Moscow, he won gold medals in the all-around, on the horizontal bar, and in the floor exercise where he was the first gymnast to perform a triple back somersault. He won the silver medal on the still rings and the bronze on the vault. At the 1987 World Artistic Gymnastics Championships in Rotterdam, he won the team competition with the Soviet Union. At the 1988 Summer Olympics in Seoul, South Korea, Liukin won the gold medal in the team competition, and was the co-champion on the horizontal bar with fellow Soviet gymnast Vladimir Artemov. Liukin won the silver medal in the all-around and on the parallel bars. At the 1991 World Artistic Gymnastics Championships in Indianapolis, he again was a member of the champion Soviet team in the Team competition. He won the bronze medal in the All-Around.

Following the dissolution of the Soviet Union, Liukin competed for his native Kazakhstan,  most notably at the 1993 World Artistic Gymnastics Championships and the 1994 Asian Games, but did not win a medal at either competition.

Coaching

Liukin coached USA's second consecutive all around Olympic champion, his daughter, Nastia Liukin, to the 2008 Summer Olympics.  In addition, Nastia contributed to team USA's silver medal finish in the team competition. She also earned silver on uneven bars, silver on balance beam, and bronze in the floor exercise.

Notable gymnasts trained by Liukin include 2010 National Champion and 6-time world medalist Rebecca Bross as well as 2011 junior National champion and 2013 American Cup champion Katelyn Ohashi. Bross placed second in the all-around competition at the World Championships in London 2009 and teammate Ivana Hong placed third in the beam competition. However, Rebecca Bross and Nastia Liukin both failed to qualify for the London 2012 Olympic team. This resulted in Liukin's retirement from international and senior competition. Ohashi was too young to meet the eligibility criteria to compete in the Olympics. Bross's current gymnastics career status is "undecided", though she remains a coach at her old gym.

Liukin was the International Coach of the Year in 2000 and 2004. He was inducted into the International Gymnastics Hall of Fame in 2005.

On 16 September 2016, he was named the coordinator for the United States women's national gymnastics team, replacing the retiring Márta Károlyi. On February 2, 2018, Liukin resigned from this role amid the USA Gymnastics sex abuse scandal.

Controversies

Racial comments
In a 2019 interview, Liukin made the following comments about black gymnasts: "But yes, gymnastics is changing. In the Code of Points, difficulty is very valued now. Of course, this suits African Americans. They’re very explosive – look at the NBA, who’s playing and jumping there?"

Weight shaming
Several gymnasts trained by Liukin, including Megan Marenghi, Katelyn Ohashi, and Vanessa Atler, have come forward and accused Liukin of repeatedly shaming them about their weight even as young adolescents, leading several of them to develop eating disorders and depression.

SafeSport investigation

In 2022, Liukin was to head Team USA at an international competition in Germany while under investigation by the United States Center for SafeSport for allegedly verbally and psychologically abusing athletes and pressuring them to train or compete with broken bones or while ill, some when they were as young as 10 years old.

Personal life
He married Anna Kotchneva, a 1987 World Champion rhythmic gymnast, while still competing himself. Their daughter, Nastia Liukin, was born in Moscow in 1989. In 1992, Liukin moved to the United States and began a coaching career. Liukin originally settled in New Orleans, but later moved to Plano, Texas.

Liukin owns and runs three World Olympic Gymnastics Academy (WOGA) locations with business partner Yevgeny Marchenko.

He had a small cameo in the film Stick It as the spotter in his daughter's uneven bars routine.

References

External links

 World Olympic Gymnastics Academy Homepage
 List of Competitive Results at Gymn Forum
 Full Biography
 
 Valeri Liukin Video Interviews on Gymnastike.org
 CG Animation

1966 births
Living people
Gymnasts at the 1988 Summer Olympics
Russian emigrants to the United States
Kazakhstani male artistic gymnasts
Medalists at the World Artistic Gymnastics Championships
Olympic gold medalists for the Soviet Union
Olympic silver medalists for the Soviet Union
Olympic gymnasts of the Soviet Union
Olympic medalists in gymnastics
Valeri
Kazakhstani people of Russian descent
People from Parker, Texas
American people of Kazakhstani descent
Honoured Masters of Sport of the USSR
Soviet male artistic gymnasts
People from Aktobe
Gymnasts at the 1994 Asian Games
Gymnastics in Texas
World Olympic Gymnastics Academy
Medalists at the 1988 Summer Olympics
People with acquired American citizenship
Asian Games competitors for Kazakhstan
Originators of elements in artistic gymnastics
European champions in gymnastics